Sir Richard Worsley (1923–2013) was a British Army general.

Richard Worsley may also refer to:

Sir Richard Worsley, 1st Baronet (1589–1621), MP
 Sir Richard Worsley, 7th Baronet (1751–1805), English politician and collector of antiquities
Richard Worsley (16th century MP), in 1539 MP for Hampshire
Richard Worsley (cricketer), English cricketer and British Army officer